John Mohring may refer to:
 John Mohring (linebacker, born 1956), American football player
 John Mohring (linebacker, born 1984), American football player